James Young may refer to:

In business
James R. Young (UP) (1952–2014), president, CEO and chairman of Union Pacific Railroad
James R. Young (North Carolina politician) (1853–1937), Insurance Commissioner of North Carolina
James Webb Young (1886–1973), American advertising executive

In medicine and science
James Young (physician) (1929–2008), American White House physician
James Young (chemist) (1811–1883), Scottish chemist; distilled paraffin from coal
James Whitney Young (born 1941), American astronomer
James Edward Young, American physicist

In politics
James Young (Canadian politician) (1835–1913), member of the Canadian House of Commons
James Young (Texas politician) (1866–1942), U.S. Representative from Texas
James Young (mayor) (born 1955), first African American to be elected mayor of Philadelphia, Mississippi, 2009
James Young (New Brunswick politician) (1841–1907), merchant and political figure in New Brunswick, Canada
James Young (Upper Canada politician) (1777–1831), political figure in Upper Canada
James Young (trade unionist) (1887–1975), Scottish politician and trade unionist
James Addison Young (1815–1875), American politician from Iowa
Alexander Young (New Zealand politician) (James Alexander Young, 1875–1956), New Zealand politician 
James H. Young (1860–1921), African-American North Carolina politician
James Henry Young (1834–1908), colonial Australian businessman and politician
James Young (Missouri politician) (1800–1878), lieutenant governor of Missouri who also served in the Tennessee House of Representatives
James R. Young (Pennsylvania politician) (1847–1924), U.S. Representative from Pennsylvania
James M. Young (politician), American state legislator from Mississippi

In sports
James Young (American football) (born 1950), former professional American football defensive end
James Young (basketball) (born 1995), American basketball player
James Young (cricketer) (1913–1994), South African cricketer
James Young (footballer, born 1882) (1882–1922), Scottish footballer, played for Celtic F.C. and Scotland
James Young (footballer, born 1891) (1891–?), Scottish footballer
James Young (hurler), hurling player from County Laois, Ireland
Jamie Young (born 1985), Anglo-Australian soccer goalkeeper

In the arts
James Young (American musician) (born 1949), guitarist for the band Styx
James Young (British musician) (born 1952), author and musical collaborator with Nico
James Young (comedian) (1918–1974), Northern Irish comedian
James Young (album), a comedy album by James Young 
James Young (director) (1872–1948), American film director and actor
James Hardy Vaux (1782–?), wrote the first Australian dictionary and used James Young as an alias

In the judiciary and academia
James Scott Young (1848–1914), United States federal judge
James Sterling Young (1927–2013), American historian and professor
James Drummond Young, Lord Drummond Young (born 1950), judge of the Supreme Courts of Scotland
James Fred Young, president of Elon University

In the military
James Young (Royal Navy officer, born 1717) (1717–1789), Royal Navy officer
James Young (Royal Navy officer, born 1762) (1762–1833), Royal Navy officer
James M. Young (1843–1913), American soldier and Medal of Honor recipient
James Young (British Army officer) (1858–1926), British general

Others
James Jubilee Young (1887–1962), Baptist minister
James Harvey Young (1915–2006), social historian
James Young (Arizona pioneer) (1844–1935), African-American boxer and Arizona pioneer

See also
James Young (coachbuilder), a coachbuilder for carriages or automobiles
Jim Young (disambiguation)
Jimmy Young (disambiguation)
James Yonge (disambiguation)
Jaymes Young (born 1991), American singer songwriter